Thuri (Turi) is a Luo language of South Sudan. The number of speakers is unknown; 6,600 were reported in 1956 (Tucker and Bryan).

Bodho is said to be a dialect, but has also been reported to be closer to Luwo.

References

Luo languages